The Mauser Model 1871 adopted as the Gewehr 71 or Infanterie-Gewehr 71, or "Infantry Rifle 71" ("I.G.Mod.71" was stamped on the rifles themselves) was the first rifle model in a distinguished line designed and manufactured by Paul Mauser and Wilhelm Mauser of the Mauser company and later mass-produced at Spandau arsenal.

History
Paul Mauser developed his bolt-action rifle from 1867 to 1871. In 1870–71 trials with 2,500 test rifles took place, with the M1869 Bavarian Werder being the Mausers' chief competitor. The Mauser was provisionally adopted on 2 December 1871, pending the development of an appropriate safety. With support from the government's Spandau arsenal, the improvements to the safety mechanism were completed and the rifle was formally accepted on 14 February 1872 as Infantry Rifle Model 1871 by the German Empire, excluding Bavaria that adopted the Werder. The rifles were issued to the German Army from late 1873 to 1875, with approximately 1.82 million rifles and Jägerbüchse and 80,000–100,000 carbines produced. The Mauser 1871 was replaced by the magazine-fed, smokeless powder using Gewehr 1888 from 1888 through 1890.

Design
The action was not based on its predecessor, the Dreyse needle gun which had seen service during the Franco-Prussian War of 1870–71, and which was found to have a number of weaknesses. The now well known Mauser "wing" type safety lever was developed for the Gewehr 71. The Gewehr 71 is a conventional-looking bolt action chambered in 11mm using black powder cartridges. The action included only a bolt guide rib as its single locking lug, locking forward of the receiving bridge. The original design was a single-shot.

After troop trials in 1882 and 1883, the design was updated in 1884 with an 8-round tubular magazine designed by Alfred von Kropatschek, making this the German Army's first repeating rifle (a prototype of a M1871 with some tubular magazine was in fact show to Wilhelm II as early as September 1881). This version was designated the Gewehr 1871/84, of which over a million examples were produced. A version of this repeater was adopted by the Ottoman Empire. Designated  M1887, it differed from the M71/84 in that it had a side-mounted cleaning rod, a second locking lug on the rear of the bolt and that it was in 9.5×60mmR, which Paul Mauser touted as the most efficient (black powder) cartridge. In the early 20th century, a few were converted to 7.65×53mm smokeless by the arsenal in Ankara.

A short version, the M1871 Jägerbüchse was developed for the Jäger or light infantry and served with engineers, fortress and navy units. It was a shortened and lightened M71. A Karabiner 1871 was also developed to equipped the German cavalry but did not enter full-scale production until 1876. A shorter version of the Model 1871, the M1879 Grenzaufsehergewehr, was issued to the border guards in 1880. It shot a unique 11.15×37.5mmR cartridge, a trimmed down version of the full-power military cartridge.

Various German arsenals and the Austrian company Steyr also manufactured the M71 rifle.

Serbia adopted a more up-to-date version of the rifle in 1881, the M1878/80, still single-shot, but chambered in its own 10.15×63R caliber. It had unique additions in that it had a bolt guide (much like the M1870 Italian Vetterli) and the "progressive rifling" (rifling which increases in twist rate as the bullet travels up the bore, to more gradually impart spin) developed by the Serbian Major Kosta "Koka" Milovanović (Коста "Кока" Миловановић), and it is commonly known as "Mauser-Koka", "Mauser-Milovanović", or "Kokinka" ("Кокинка"). It saw first combat in the Serbo-Bulgarian War. Approximately 110,000 Mauser-Koka rifles entered the Serbian arsenal. Starting 1907, about half of these were converted in Kragujevac to shoot the 7×57mm from a 5-shot box magazine; the new barrels were purchased from Steyr. Both the old and new guns (designated M80/07) saw action in the Balkan Wars and World War I. The converted M80/07 are often referred to as "Đurić Mausers" (Ђурић-Маузер).

In 1894, Uruguay had their stockpile of M71 rifles converted to smokeless 6.5×53.5mm SR (Daudeteau system) by Société Française d'Armes Portatives Saint Denis in France. They were given new stocks, barrels, sights, bands, and side-mounted cleaning rods. However, the initial batch of ammunition that was sent with the rifles was incorrect and unusable in the guns.

Service 
The M71 was used by the Korean Empire Army (especially Guard units—this rifle replaced the Russian Berdan rifle).  The number of rifles used is uncertain but the Korean Empire manufactured ammunition for them, which means that the Korean Empire used a respectable number of them. From 1876, the Chinese Qing dynasty bought M71 rifles and carbines from Mauser, Steyr and Spangenberg&Sauer. After the Germans adopted the Gewehr 1888, over 1,000,000 discarded Model 1871 and 1871/84 were put into Chinese service.

The South African Republic secretly received many M71 rifles, that saw combat during the First Boer War, the Jameson Raid and the Second Boer War. Some rifles were smuggled to Ethiopia and they were used during the 1894-1896 war against the Italians.

The M71 saw service during the Boxer Rebellion. The Chinese units used the old M71 while German forces used the M71/84. The Chinese also used the M71 during the First Sino-Japanese War and the Xinhai Revolution.

Serbia and Turkey used their M71-based Mausers in the Balkan Wars and during World War I. The M71 Jäger rifles saw service in African theatre of World War I, being the standard rifle of the Schutztruppe. At the same time, Gew 71 with incendiary bullets were used to shoot down observation balloons and German home-guard units were still equipped with M71/84 rifles. Some of these rifles were used during the German Revolution of 1918–19 and surviving rifles were distributed to the Volkssturm units in 1945.

The M71 was also exported to Japan for testing and was used to improve the design of the Murata rifle. Uruguay, Siam and Honduras also fielded the M71 from the 1880s. Venezuela bought 27,000 M71/84 rifles after they were retired from front-line German service, while Ecuador acquired 12,000 M71/84s.

Irish Republicans imported some 1,500 single-shot 1871 Mausers in the Howth gun-running for the nationalist militia called the Irish Volunteers in 1914. They were used in action by the Volunteers in the Easter Rising of 1916, the insurrection aimed at ending British rule in Ireland which began the Irish War of Independence.  The 1871 Mauser became known in Ireland as the "Howth Mauser".

Comparison with contemporary rifles

Operators
: Model 71
: Model 71
: Model 71
: Model 71
: Model 71
: Model 71/84
: Model 71
: Models 71/84, Quebec Home Guard use (Rifles marked Q.H.G.) 
: Models 71,79 and 71/84
 : Model 71/84
: Model 71
Irish Volunteers: Model 71
: Model 71
: Model 71
: Model 71 and Mauser-Koka
: Model 87
: Model 71
: Model 71, Model 71/84
: Model 71
: Model 71/84

In fiction and popular culture 
11-mm Mauser is the service rifle of the Martian Army in The Sirens of Titan by Kurt Vonnegut. However, the book states these were bought as surplus from the Spanish–American War, which would in fact make them Model 1893 7×57mm Mauser.

In the film The Last Samurai, the Japanese Imperial Army carries German bolt-action Mauser M1871/84 rifles. The 1884 models were altered in appearance by the filmmakers to resemble the more period-accurate 1871 models.

Gallery

See also
List of firearms

Footnotes

References
 
 
 Dieter Storz: Deutsche Militärgewehre. Vom Werdergewehr bis zum Modell 71/84. In: Kataloge des bayerischen Armee-Museums Ingolstadt. Band 8, Wien 2011, .

External links
 Official Manual 
 
 Mauser-Milovanović (many photos)
 



Early rifles
Bolt-action rifles
Rifles of Germany
Mauser rifles
Single-shot rifles
Weapons of the Ottoman Empire